Gabbiano (Italian for "seagull") may refer to:-

Aircraft
Ambrosini SAI.10 Gabbiano, a floatplane version of the Ambrosini SAI.10 Grifone 
CANT Z.501 Gabbiano, a single engined flying boat in service 1934-50
Meteor S-21 Gabbiano, a two-seat trainer aircraft.
Teichfuss Gabbiano, a glider
Places
Castel Gabbiano, Lombardy, Italy

Ships
, a class of 59 ships that served with the Regia Marina and Kriegsmarine during World War II
, a number of ships with this name
, a re-engined Victory ship in service 1951-70